Hearts of Iron IV, also known as HOI4, is a grand strategy computer wargame developed by Paradox Development Studio and published by Paradox Interactive. It was released worldwide on 6 June 2016. It is the sequel to 2009's Hearts of Iron III and the fourth main installment in the Hearts of Iron series. Like previous games in the series, Hearts of Iron IV is a grand strategy wargame that focuses on World War II. The player may take control of any nation in the world in either 1936 or 1939 and lead them to victory or defeat against other countries.

By May 2018, the game had sold a total of one  million and a half copies worldwide.

Gameplay
Hearts of Iron IV is a grand strategy wargame that primarily revolves around World War II. The player may play as any nation in the world in the 1936 or 1939 start dates in singleplayer or multiplayer, although the game is not designed to go beyond 1948. A nation's military is divided between naval forces, aerial forces, and ground forces. For the ground forces, the player may train, customize, and command divisions consisting of various types of infantry, tanks, and other units. These divisions require equipment and manpower to fight properly. The navy and air force also require men and equipment, including the actual warships and warplanes that are used in combat. Equipment is produced by military factories, while ships are built by dockyards. These military factories and dockyards are, in turn, constructed by civilian factories, which also construct a variety of other buildings, produce consumer goods for the civilian population, and oversee commerce with other nations. Most nations are initially forced to devote a significant number of their civilian factories to producing consumer goods, but as the nation becomes increasingly mobilized, more factories will be freed up for other purposes. Mobilization is represented as a "policy" that the player may adjust with the proper amount of political power, an abstract "resource" that is also used to appoint new ministers and change other facets of the nation's government. In addition to mobilization, there are other policies, including the nation's stance on conscription and commerce.

Land in Hearts of Iron IV is divided into tiny regions known as provinces (also called tiles), which are grouped to form states. Each state has a certain amount of building slots, factory slots, and 5 infrastructure slots. The major seas and oceans (for warships) and the sky (for warplanes) are similarly divided into different regions. These provinces each have a type of terrain assigned to them that determines how well different types of units will perform in combat there. Divisions are placed in provinces and can attack enemy units in adjacent provinces. How well divisions perform in combat depends on various factors, such as the quality of their equipment, the weather, the type of terrain, the skill and traits of the general commanding the divisions, aerial combat in the region and the morale of both sides. Technologies can be researched to improve equipment. Military doctrines can be upgraded by using army XP, among other things, which often means that a more technologically advanced nation will have an edge in combat. If a division (or a group of divisions) successfully overwhelms an enemy province, they may occupy it. Some provinces may have victory points, which can push a nation closer towards capitulation if occupied. Occupying key provinces within a state allows the occupying power to access the enemy's factories and natural resources in that state. Resistance to occupation within a state can hamper the occupying power's control over it. Late in the game, nations may develop nuclear bombs if they have the proper technology, which can be used to devastate enemy provinces and states.

Hearts of Iron IV also attempts to recreate the complex diplomatic relationships of the day. Nations may undertake a variety of diplomatic actions; they may sign non-aggression pacts, guarantee the independence of other nations, and offer or request military access, amongst other things. Another key feature of diplomacy is the ability to create a faction or invite other nations to an existing one. Factions represent the main alliances of the era, like the Axis and Allies (for gameplay purposes, real-world factions like the Axis and Allies are split into numerous smaller factions, like the Comintern, the Chinese United Front, and the Co-Prosperity Sphere). Faction members may assist each other in wars, making faction members precious assets. Some more clandestine diplomatic actions are also available. For example, the player may justify war against other nations, spread their ideology abroad, or stage a coup. Countries in the game may be democratic, fascist, communist, or non-aligned. Each of the four ideologies has advantages and disadvantages; for example, fascist nations can go to war with other countries easily, but other nations are not as willing to trade with them as they are with democratic countries. If a different ideology becomes too popular in a country, a referendum may be held that will peacefully convert the nation to the most popular ideology. Otherwise, ideologies may come to power violently through coups, civil wars, or forced subjugation by a foreign power.

This diplomacy is further expanded through the addition of espionage in the expansion La Résistance, which extends gameplay in the management of occupied territories which is done differently according to player choices and ideology. Furthermore, the operation of spy networks allows nations to steal technology, gather information on an opponents's military, and engage in other espionage efforts.

While Hearts of Iron IV does feature some scripted events, the game features a "national focus" system that makes fixed events less necessary than in previous installments in the series. Each country in the game has a "focus tree" with various "national focuses" that grant certain effects or trigger events. For example, for the Anschluss to occur, Germany must first complete the focus that is related to it. Other focuses can grant special bonuses, like faster research times for certain technologies or extra factories. While some bonuses (like extra factories) are very tangible, others (like improvements to morale) are more abstract. These abstract bonuses are represented by "national spirits" that can be temporary or permanent. Not all national spirits are granted by focuses, and not all spirits are entirely beneficial. Focuses are completed over time; only one focus may be worked on at once, and working on one consumes some political power. Initially, only a handful of key nations, like Nazi Germany, the United Kingdom, the Soviet Union, and the United States, had unique focus trees; all other nations shared a generic one. Subsequent updates and DLCs have added focus trees to other nations as well.

Hearts of Iron IV also introduces the concept of "world tension", an abstract representation of how close the world is to global war, on a scale from 0 to 100. Aggressive actions by any nation can increase world tension, while peaceful actions can decrease it. Depending on the circumstances of a nation, like their ideology, a certain level of world tension may be necessary to perform certain actions, like justifying war against another country.

Expansions and mods

Expansions

Mods
Hearts of Iron IV was developed to be more open-ended than previous games in the series. Partially as a result of this, the game can be more readily modded than its predecessors. According to game director Dan Lind, 64% of Hearts of Iron IV players use mods. Many mods do not change the gameplay experience drastically, and as such have become mainstays of the community, for example, 'Player-Led Peace Conferences', which gives the player more control over the outcome of the game. Also, several total conversion mods that dramatically change the game have been developed and released in many places, like the Steam Workshop. Some mods have been successful enough to attract attention from the media, including the following:

Kaiserreich: Legacy of the Weltkrieg, a mod set in a world where the Central Powers won World War I. Kaiserreich is considered the largest and most in-depth Hearts of Iron IV mod by many community members.
Old World Blues is a mod set in the Fallout universe. This mod has been praised for its effective portrayal of the Fallout series within a grand strategy setting.
The New Order: Last Days of Europe, is a mod set in a world where the Axis Powers won World War II. The mod has received praise for its rich storytelling and the dark and esoteric atmosphere that is present within the mod. 

Some other mods have also attracted controversy for racist and fascist overtones, such as Deus Vult, a mod that adds the Knights Templar to the game and allows the player to commit various atrocities.

Development
Hearts of Iron IV was announced in 2014 and was originally slated for a late 2015 release. At E3 2015, creative director Johan Andersson confirmed that the game would be pushed back from its original release window, with the new release date being scheduled for the first quarter of 2016. This was an attempt to resolve several issues encountered with the game. In March 2016, it was announced that the game, built with the Clausewitz Engine, would be released on 6 June 2016, which was the 72nd anniversary of the Normandy landings.

Reception

Hearts of Iron IV was a commercial success. It sold more than 200,000 units within two weeks of its launch, which made it the fastest-selling historically-themed Paradox title by that time, ahead of Crusader Kings II and Europa Universalis IV. The game's sales surpassed 500,000 units in February 2017, and 1 million units in May 2018. It was the first Hearts of Iron game to reach the million mark, and the third Paradox title after, Crusader Kings II and Europa Universalis IV to do so. The game received "generally favorable reviews" from critics, according to the review aggregator Metacritic.

GameSpot gave the game a positive review, writing that "Hearts of Iron IV embodies the hard truths about all-consuming war and the international politics that guide it." It argued that the tutorial was the only weak point, and that "for the dedicated, Hearts of Iron IV could end up being the best grand strategy game in some time."

It was also reviewed in Kotaku, with the reviewer writing it was "overwhelming in both its depth and, more importantly, its complexity" and arguing that some players unfamiliar with the franchise might find the game interface too complex to navigate easily.

IGN wrote a positive review, describing it as "an incredibly complex World War II simulation that will require potentially hundreds of hours to master, both in-game and poring over wiki articles that read like an economics textbook", but adding that "the payoff is brilliant for those willing to put in the time to learn". The review praised the layout, writing "thanks to an unusually striking look and clean, easily navigable interface, the biggest challenges Hearts of Iron 4 presents us with are the good kind: strategic planning, division composition, and fine-tuning economic and political policies". IGN went on to conclude that Hearts of Iron IV "is a strong contender for the title of the ultimate armchair-general game. The biggest problems I can point to are almost all performance-related, putting a slow, frustrating finale on what is otherwise an ingeniously detailed strategic stimulation of just about every aspect of 20th-century global warfare".

A review in PC Gamer described it as a "unique, beautiful, thrilling wargame", specifically praising its frontline system and production mechanics, but also criticising the ideology system for being too bland, and finding that combat was somewhat unintuitive, writing "while I found several flaws when I stood close to the tapestry, it's important to remember that Hearts of Iron 4 exists to encompass the whole sweep of the war".

Polygon praised the openness of the game, writing that "Hearts of Iron 4 goes a step further, allowing players to take control of nearly every single nation-state in the world during the same period. If you want to play as Eleazar López Contreras, a Venezuelan fascist with two army divisions and 12 fighter planes to his name, you can give it a go".

In 2022, six years after the game's release and shortly after the By Blood Alone expansion, Hearts of Iron IV hit a concurrent player record of about 70,000, owing to a week-long deal that temporarily made the game free-to-play. The year prior, the game had reached a record of 68,000.

See also

List of grand strategy video games
List of World War II video games
List of Paradox Interactive games

Notes

References

External links
 
 Official wiki

2016 video games
Computer wargames
Government simulation video games
Grand strategy video games
Linux games
MacOS games
Multiplayer and single-player video games
Paradox Interactive games
Video game sequels
Video games developed in Sweden
Windows games
World War II grand strategy computer games
World War II video games